Time Out is a Bollywood film starring Chirag Malhotra and Pranay Pachauri in the lead roles. It is written and directed by Rikhil Bahadur.

Plot

Gaurav finds out that his elder brother Mihir is gay. He is unable to accept this as he looks up to Mihir, a high-school jock whom every girl fancies. Adding to his woes, the girl he fancies ‘friend-zones’ him.

“How to fix your gay kid” is what their mother types into Google when Mihir reveals his sexual orientation and wishes to come out of the closet.

Cast 
Chirag Malhotra as Gaurav 
Pranay Pachauri as Mihir 
Vedabrata Rao as Varun
Sanya Arora as Kanika
Riya Kothari as Tanvi
Raunaq Chopra as Zorawar
Shiva Dawar as Keith
Tarana Marwah as Ria
Amitabh Sharma as Pankaj Agarwal
Geetanjali Sharma as Shobha Aggarwal
Kaamya Sharma as Ananya
Aditya Jain as Rohan
Rahul Sharma as Coach P.K.
Rahul Tripathi as Rahul Tripathi

Soundtrack

The music of Time Out is composed by Sandesh Shandilya.

References

Hindustan Times

http://www.thehindu.com/features/cinema/voice-of-the-youth-by-the-youth/article7619434.ece
http://www.bollywoodlife.com/news-gossip/12-minute-short-film-time-out-turned-into-feature-movie/

External links
 

2015 films
2015 LGBT-related films
2015 romantic drama films
2010s Hindi-language films
2010s teen drama films
2010s teen romance films
Gay-related films
Indian LGBT-related films
Indian romantic drama films
Indian romantic musical films
Indian teen drama films
Indian teen romance films
LGBT-related romantic drama films
Teen LGBT-related films
Viacom18 Studios films